Our Days of Eulogy is the first compilation album by American metalcore band Unearth. The first half of the CD contains live recordings while the second half is a collection of songs from their EPs Above the Fall of Man and Endless.

Track listing
 "My Heart Bleeds No Longer" (live) – 4:41
 "Fuel the Fire" (live) – 3:52
 "Internal War" (live) – 3:42
 "Only the People" (live) – 3:38
 "One Step Away" (live) – 3:59
 "Endless" – 3:16
 "Internal War" – 3:43
 "Charm" – 3:09
 "My Desire" – 4:51
 "Shattered by the Sun" – 3:50
 "Call to Judgement" – 3:34
 "Convictions" – 4:23
 "Lefty" – 5:19

(note: On the CD itself as well on the back cover of the cd case, the live versions of "Internal War" and "Only the People" are reversed due to a manufacturing glitch)

Eulogy Recordings took advantage of their final Unearth release to include a bonus disc sampling their most promising acts:
 "Dogfight" by Evergreen Terrace – 3:16
 "More Than Life" by On Broken Wings – 2:58
 "The King Is Dead" by Hoods – 2:12
 "They Live" by Calico System – 3:13
 "Devil in Disguise" by Shattered Realm – 1:48
 "Gator Smash" by Kids Like Us – 3:07
 "We Weren't Brought Up Right" by Black My Heart – 3:23
 "Know This X" by Casey Jones – 1:43
 "Set the Stage" by Warriors – 2:16

References

2005 live albums
2005 compilation albums
Unearth albums
Eulogy Recordings albums